The Holy Trinity Church (German: Dreifaltigkeitskirche), full name Reformation Memorial Church of the Holy Trinity (German: Reformations-Gedächtniskirche zur Heiligen Dreifaltigkeit) is the largest Protestant church in Worms. The baroque hall building is centrally located on the market square of the city and is now under conservation.

Churches in Worms, Germany
Heritage sites in Rhineland-Palatinate
Protestant churches in Rhineland-Palatinate